Enteromius nigrifilis is a species of ray-finned fish in the genus Enteromius, it is found in the Democratic Republic of the Congo.

Footnotes 

 

Enteromius
Taxa named by John Treadwell Nichols
Fish described in 1928
Endemic fauna of the Democratic Republic of the Congo